Tol-e Ashki (also Romanized as Tol-e Ashkī and Tolashkī; also known as Tūl Ashki) is a village in Howmeh Rural District, in the Central District of Bushehr County, Bushehr Province, Iran. At the 2006 census, its population was 717, in 170 families.

References 

Populated places in Bushehr County